The River Lett is a perennial stream of the Hawkesbury-Nepean catchment. It is located in the Central Tablelands region of New South Wales, Australia.

Course

The Great Western Highway traverses the River Lett near Hartley, at the bottom of the ascent of River Lett Hill. The remains of an old timber bridge that carried traffic on the Great Western Highway over the River Lett can be found near the settlement of Hartley.

See also

 List of rivers of Australia
 List of rivers of New South Wales (L–Z)
 Rivers of New South Wales

References

Rivers of New South Wales
Central Tablelands
City of Lithgow